Sangeet 106.1FM (106.1 FM) is a radio station Broadcasting from Trinidad and Tobago owned and operated by The TBC Radio Network. It was formerly known as Prime 106.1FM broadcasting Pop format.

Radio stations in Trinidad and Tobago